The 2020–21 BSC Young Boys season was the club's 96th season in existence and the club's 25th consecutive season in the top flight of Swiss football. In addition to the domestic league, Young Boys participated in this season's editions of the Swiss Cup, the UEFA Champions League and the UEFA Europa League. The season covered the period from 19 September 2020 to 30 June 2021.

On 18 April 2021, Young Boys secured their fourth straight league title, and the club's fifteenth overall, with a 3–0 home win over Lugano.

Players

First-team squad

Out on loan

Transfers

In

Out

Pre-season and friendlies

Competitions

Overview

Swiss Super League

League table

Results summary

Results by round

Matches

Swiss Cup

UEFA Champions League

UEFA Europa League

Group stage

The group stage draw was held on 2 October 2020.

Knockout phase

Round of 32
The draw for the round of 32 was held on 14 December 2020.

Round of 16
The draw for the round of 16 was held on 26 February 2021.

Statistics

Squad statistics
Last updated on 21 May 2021.

|-
! colspan="14" style="background:#dcdcdc; text-align:center"|Goalkeepers

|-
! colspan="14" style="background:#dcdcdc; text-align:center"|Defenders

|-
! colspan="14" style="background:#dcdcdc; text-align:center"|Midfielders

|-
! colspan="14" style="background:#dcdcdc; text-align:center"|Forwards

|-
! colspan=14 style=background:#dcdcdc; text-align:center|Players who have made an appearance this season but have left the club

|}

Goalscorers

Last updated: 28 February 2021UEFA

Clean sheets

Last updated: 25 February 2021UEFA

Notes

References

External links

BSC Young Boys seasons
Young Boys
Young Boys
Young Boys
Swiss football championship-winning seasons